Florence Laura Goodenough (August 6, 1886 – April 4, 1959) was an American psychologist and professor at the University of Minnesota who studied child intelligence and various problems in the field of child development. She was president of the Society for Research in Child Development from 1946-1947. She is best known for published book The Measurement of Intelligence, where she introduced the Goodenough Draw-A-Man test (now the Draw-A-Person Test) to assess intelligence in young children through nonverbal measurement.  She is noted for developing the Minnesota Preschool Scale.  In 1931 she published two notable books titled Experimental Child Study (with John E. Anderson) and Anger in Young Children which analyzed the methods used in evaluating children. She wrote the Handbook of Child Psychology in 1933, becoming the first known psychologist to critique ratio I.Q.

Early life
Florence Laura Goodenough was born to Alice and Linus Goodenough on August 6, 1886, in Honesdale, Pennsylvania and was the youngest of nine children. She was home-schooled and received the equivalent of a high school diploma

Academic career 
In 1908 Goodenough graduated with a Bachelor of Pedagogy (B.Pd.) from Millersville, Pennsylvania Normal School, although there is not much documentation of her time at Millersville, she spent almost a decade teaching at rural schools in Pennsylvania before going further with her education. She then went on to earn her bachelor's (B.S.) from Columbia University in 1920, and only a year later, she received her M.A. under advisor Leta Hollingworth, at Columbia as well. From 1920-1921, she also served as the director of research for the Rutherford & Perth Amboy public schools in the state of New Jersey. It was during her time in public schools when she actually conducted a majority of her data.

It was not until 1921 when Goodenough started working with Lewis Terman at Stanford University. Terman was establishing a study on gifted children and was selecting potential researchers for his work. She was chosen, and contributed throughout the project, serving as chief field psychologist and chief research psychologist. She was listed as a contributor to Terman's book Genetic Studies of Genius, which was a rare deal for females during the time. She received her Ph.D. from Stanford University in 1924, at the age of 35. Soon after, in 1925, she joined the Institute of Child Welfare at the University of Minnesota as an Assistant Professor under John E. Anderson. She became a full-time professor in 1931 and worked until she retired in 1947. Anderson and Goodenough were noted as offering some of the first undergraduate and graduate courses in developmental psychology.

During her time at the University of Minnesota, Goodenough created the Draw-a-Man test (Goodenough-Harris Draw-A-Person Test), which could measure intelligence in children. She published the test in Measurement of Intelligence (1926) by drawing, which included detailed accounts of procedures, scoring, and examples. After her publication of the Draw-a-Man test, Goodenough expanded the Stanford Binet scale for children into the Minnesota Preschool Scale in 1932. Goodenough's most significant contribution to psychology was her advancement of sampling in 1928, which would become to be known as event and time sampling, a method still in extensive use to this day.

It is in one of her most underrated contributions, in which Goodenough actually conducted her time sampling, in her publication Anger in Young Children (1931), which analyzed the methods used in evaluating children. It was critiqued primarily because many questioned the use of mothers as research participants, with many doubting that nonscientists would successfully record observations for a study. Goodenough's objective was to analyze John B. Watson's assertion that newborns were primarily only capable of three different emotions; these included rage, fear, and love. She gathered forty-one participants ranging from infancy through seven years old and trained the parents to use event sampling and track the outbursts of anger they saw in their children. It was through this experiment that she suggested that children who were less than one year old, had the most notable triggers of anger due to repetitive child care, minimal physical irritations, and limitations of physical movement. However, Goodenough's research findings indicated that by the time the child reached the age of four, social interactions became the most significant basis of anger. Goodenough's findings led her to theorize that it was not the environment that was most influential in emotional development, but actually maturation in young children.

Overall, Goodenough's publication led to a crucial descriptive awareness for parents and professionals to help acknowledge diverse emotional inclinations in child development. This ultimately led her to continue with several more publications on child development, maturation, and emotion. Many researchers still appreciate Goodenough's publication on emotional development because of its descriptive and detailed use of the methodology used. Goodenough's experiment represented one of the first few large scale analyses done through observations, and research is still considered one of the most detailed analyses of emotional development in children.

Goodenough was never married.

During World War II, she developed for the Women's Army Corps a projective test using free association with words having several meanings. She developed keys for masculinity-femininity and leadership but retired before she completed work on the test.

During her late career, Goodenough still published a variety of topics and important contributions. She also was known as a great educator, as one of her students who she instructed was Ruth Howard, the first African-American female, to receive a Ph.D. in psychology. However, due to a degenerative disease, she was forced to retire early and moved to New-Hampshire, where she eventually went blind. Despite the illness which induced a loss in sight and hearing, Goodenough published three more books after learning braille; Mental Testing: Its History, Principles, and Applications in 1949, Exceptional Children in 1954, and the third edition of Developmental Psychology in 1959.  Altogether, Goodenough published 10 texts and 26 research articles. She died of a stroke in Florida on April 4, 1959.

IQ testing
Goodenough revised and invented tests for children. Studying exceptional children, child psychology in general, and anger and fear specifically were all points of experimentation for Goodenough's career. She published her first book: The Measurement of Intelligence by Drawings in 1926 which introduced her thoughts and ideas of children's I.Q. testing. In this book, Goodenough presented her I.Q. test for preschoolers called the Draw-A-Man Test. Goodenough drew much recognition due to her Draw-A-Man Test, a nonverbal measure of intelligence. The test was known to be very reliable due to her extremely strict criteria for rating each drawing because it was well correlated with written I.Q. tests. This test was initially geared towards children ages two through 13. The Draw-A-Man test eventually developed into a Draw-A-Woman Test due to critics believing many females would not necessarily be able to identify with a male.

Academic Work & Contributions 
Director of research for the Rutherford & Perth Amboy public schools (1920-1921)

Research assistant in Psychology under Lewis Terman, Stanford University (1921-1925).

Assistant Professor under John E. Anderson (1925-1930)

Published her first book- The Measurement of Intelligence by Drawings(1926)

Published the Draw-a-Man test (1926)

Published Anger in Young Children and the Measurement of Mental Growth(1931)

Published Minnesota Preschool Scale (1932)

Full time professor at the University of Minnesota (1931-1947)

President of the National Counsel of Women Psychologists (1942)

President of the Society for Research in Child Development (1946-1947).

Timeline
 1886: Born in Honesdale, Pennsylvania
 1908: Bachelor of Pedogogy (B.Pd.) earned from Normal School in Millersville, Pennsylvania.
 1920: B.S. from Columbia University under Leta Hollingsworth.
 Director of Research in the Rutherford and Perth Amboy New Jersey public schools.
 Began to document the effects of environment on intelligence test scores.
 1921: M.A. earned from Columbia University under Leta Hollingsworth.
 First began working with Lewis Terman at Stanford University.
 1923: Published The Stanford Achievement Test.
 1924: PhD Philosophy earned from Stanford University under Lewis Terman.
 Worked at Minneapolis Child Guidance Clinic.
 1925: Appointed assistant professor in the Institute of Child Welfare at the University of Minnesota.
 1926: Published her first book: The Measurement of Intelligence by Drawings (Introduction to Draw-A-Man test).
 1931: Published The Measurement of Mental Growth .
 Published Anger in Young Children.
 Goodenough set out to evaluate J. B. Watson's claim that newborns were initially only capable of three emotions: rage, fear and love, by comparing children's anger in infancy and in childhood. The book reported findings that children show anger at bath time, physical discomfort, and by age four, social relations were the greatest source of anger.
 Promoted to full professor in the Institute of Child Welfare at the University of Minnesota.
 1933: Published Handbook of Child Psychology .
 1938: Served as president of the National Council of Women Psychologists.
 1940: Goodenough–Harris drawing test established, as revised by Florence Goodenough and Dale Harris.
 1947: Retired early from the University of Minnesota due to physical illness.
 1942:  the Women's Army Auxiliary Corps's (WAAC) solicited Goodenough's professional opinion in selection of tests to be given to Officer Candidates and Basics. Goodenough recommended the Goodenough Speed-of-Association Test. The test used free association to determine ratings of masculinity–femininity and leadership. Results from Candidates and Basics were used as norming data as the test was under construction. She was particularly interested in how results differed between women who were married, divorced, or single. She found that divorced women were more masculine and offered a greater percentage of rare responses compared to either of the two other groups. Early retirement cut short her work on this test and it was never completed.
 1947: Appointed Professor Emeritus until her death in 1959.
 1949: Published Mental Testing: Its History, Principles, and Applications.
 1956: Published Exceptional Children.
 Died from a stroke at the age of 73.

Works
Goodenough, F. L. (1905). Measurement of intelligence by drawings. Yonkers-on-Hudson, NY: World Book Company.
Goodenough, F. (1926). A new approach to the measurement of intelligence of young children. Journal of Genetic Psychology, 33, 185–211.
Goodenough, F. L. (1931). Anger in young children. Minneapolis, MN: University of Minnesota Press.
Goodenough, F. L. (1934). Developmental psychology: An introduction to the study of human behavior. New York, NY: Appleton-Century Crofts.
Goodenough, F. L. (1949). The appraisal of child personality. Psychological Review, 56, 123–131.
Goodenough, F. L. (1949). Mental testing: Its history, principles, and applications. New York, NY: Rinehart.
Goodenough, F. L., & Anderson, J. E. (1931). Experimental child study. New York, NY: Century.
Goodenough, F. L. (1956). Exceptional children. New York, NY: Appleton-Century Crofts.

Notes

References
Benjamin, L. T. (1980). Women in Psychology: Biography and Autobiography. Psychology of Women Quarterly, 5(1), 140–144. https://doi.org/10.1111/j.1471-6402.1981.tb01040.x
Bosler, A. (2000, May). Florence Goodenough. Retrieved from http://www.muskingum.edu/~psych/psycweb/history/goodenough.htm  
Brice, N. (n.d.). Psychology: Florence L. Goodenough. Retrieved from http://faculty.frostburg.edu/mbradley/psyography/florencegoodenough.html 
Capshew, J. H., & Laszlo, A. C. (1986). “We would not take no for an answer”: Women psychologists and gender politics during World War II. Journal of Social Issues, 42, 157–180. doi:10.1111/j.1540-4560.1986.tb00213.
Harris, D. (1959). Florence L. Goodenough, 1886–1959. Child Development, 30, 305–306.
Hartup, W. W., Johnson, A., & Weinberg, R. A. (2001). The Institute of Child Development: Pioneering in Science and Application, 1925–2000. Minneapolis, MN: Institute of Child Development, University of Minnesota.
Johnson, A. (2015). Florence Goodenough and child study: The question of mothers as researchers. History of Psychology, 18, 183–195. doi:10.1037/a0038865
Johnson, A. & Johnston, E. (2010). Unfamiliar feminisms: Revisiting the National Council of Women Psychologists. Psychology of Women Quarterly, 34, 311–327. Doi: 10.1111/j.1471-6402.2010.01577.x
Jolly, J. L. (2010). Florence L. Goodenough: Portrait of a Psychologist. Roeper Review, 32:98–105. The Roeper Institute. Doi: 10.1080/02783191003587884
Plucker, J. A. (Ed.). (2003). Human intelligence: Historical influences, current controversies, teaching resources. Retrieved March 20, 2011.
Rodkey, E. (2010). Profile of Florence Goodenough.  In A. Rutherford (Ed.), Psychology's Feminist Voices.
Thompson, D. N. (1990). Florence Laura Goodenough. In A. N. O'Connell & N. F. Russo (Eds.). Women of Psychology: A bio-bibliographic sourcebook (124–133). Westport, CT: Greenwood Press.
Stevens, G. & Gardner, S. (1982). Florence Laura Goodenough. In G. Stevens and S. Gardner (Eds.), The Women of Psychology, Volume 1: Pioneers and innovators (pp. 193–197). Cambridge, MA.: Schenkman Publishing.
Weiss, A. (n.d.). Florence Goodenough: 1886–1959. Retrieved from: http://faculty.webster.edu/woolflm/goodenough.html

External links
Finding Aid to the Florence Laura Goodenough Papers at the University of Minnesota Archives.

American women psychologists
20th-century American psychologists
Psychometricians
Columbia University alumni
People from Honesdale, Pennsylvania
1886 births
1959 deaths